This page lists all described species of the spider family Barychelidae accepted by the World Spider Catalog :

A

Ammonius

Ammonius Thorell, 1899
 A. pupulus Thorell, 1899 (type) — Cameroon

Atrophothele

Atrophothele Pocock, 1903
 A. socotrana Pocock, 1903 (type) — Yemen (Socotra)

Aurecocrypta

Aurecocrypta Raven, 1994
 A. katersi Raven, 1994 — Australia (Western Australia)
 A. lugubris Raven, 1994 (type) — Australia (Western Australia)

B

Barycheloides

Barycheloides Raven, 1994
 B. alluviophilus Raven, 1994 (type) — New Caledonia
 B. chiropterus Raven, 1994 — New Caledonia
 B. concavus Raven, 1994 — New Caledonia
 B. rouxi (Berland, 1924) — New Caledonia
 B. rufofemoratus Raven, 1994 — New Caledonia

Barychelus

Barychelus Simon, 1889
 B. badius Simon, 1889 (type) — New Caledonia
 B. complexus Raven, 1994 — New Caledonia

C

Cosmopelma

Cosmopelma Simon, 1889
 C. ceplac Mori & Bertani, 2016 — Brazil
 C. decoratum Simon, 1889 (type) — Brazil

Cyphonisia

Cyphonisia Simon, 1889
 C. affinitata Strand, 1907 — East Africa
 C. annulata Benoit, 1966 — Ghana
 C. itombwensis Benoit, 1966 — Congo
 C. kissi (Benoit, 1966) — Congo
 C. maculata (Roewer, 1953) — Congo
 C. maculipes Strand, 1906 — Cameroon
 C. manicata Simon, 1907 — Equatorial Guinea (Bioko)
 C. nesiotes Simon, 1907 — São Tomé and Príncipe
 C. nigella (Simon, 1889) — Congo
 C. obesa Simon, 1889 (type) — West, Central Africa
 C. rastellata Strand, 1907 — East Africa
 C. soleata Thorell, 1899 — Cameroon
 C. straba Benoit, 1966 — Congo

D

Diplothele

Diplothele O. Pickard-Cambridge, 1891
 D. gravelyi Siliwal, Molur & Raven, 2009 — India
 D. halyi Simon, 1892 — Sri Lanka
 D. tenebrosus Siliwal, Molur & Raven, 2009 — India
 D. walshi O. Pickard-Cambridge, 1891 (type) — India

E

Encyocrypta

Encyocrypta Simon, 1889
 E. abelardi Raven, 1994 — New Caledonia
 E. aureco Raven & Churchill, 1991 — New Caledonia
 E. berlandi Raven & Churchill, 1991 — New Caledonia
 E. bertini Raven, 1994 — New Caledonia
 E. bouleti Raven, 1994 — New Caledonia
 E. cagou Raven & Churchill, 1991 — New Caledonia
 E. colemani Raven & Churchill, 1991 — New Caledonia
 E. decooki Raven & Churchill, 1991 — New Caledonia
 E. djiaouma Raven & Churchill, 1991 — New Caledonia
 E. eneseff Raven & Churchill, 1991 — New Caledonia
 E. gracilibulba Raven, 1994 — New Caledonia
 E. grandis Raven, 1994 — New Caledonia
 E. heloiseae Raven, 1994 — New Caledonia
 E. koghi Raven & Churchill, 1991 — New Caledonia
 E. kone Raven & Churchill, 1991 — New Caledonia
 E. kottae Raven & Churchill, 1991 — New Caledonia
 E. kritscheri Raven & Churchill, 1991 — New Caledonia
 E. kwakwa Raven, 1994 — New Caledonia
 E. letocarti Raven & Churchill, 1991 — New Caledonia
 E. lugubris Raven & Churchill, 1991 — New Caledonia
 E. mckeei Raven, 1994 — New Caledonia
 E. meleagris Simon, 1889 (type) — New Caledonia
 E. montdo Raven & Churchill, 1991 — New Caledonia
 E. montmou Raven & Churchill, 1991 — New Caledonia
 E. neocaledonica Raven & Churchill, 1991 — New Caledonia
 E. niaouli Raven & Churchill, 1991 — New Caledonia
 E. ouazangou Raven, 1994 — New Caledonia
 E. oubatche Raven & Churchill, 1991 — New Caledonia
 E. panie Raven & Churchill, 1991 — New Caledonia
 E. risbeci Raven, 1994 — New Caledonia
 E. tillieri Raven & Churchill, 1991 — New Caledonia
 E. tindia Raven & Churchill, 1991 — New Caledonia

Eubrachycercus

Eubrachycercus Pocock, 1897
 E. smithi Pocock, 1897 (type) — Somalia

F

Fijocrypta

Fijocrypta Raven, 1994
 F. vitilevu Raven, 1994 (type) — Fiji

I

Idioctis

Idioctis L. Koch, 1874
 I. eniwetok Raven, 1988 — Marshall Is., Caroline Is.
 I. ferrophila Churchill & Raven, 1992 — New Caledonia
 I. helva L. Koch, 1874 (type) — Fiji
 I. intertidalis (Benoit & Legendre, 1968) — Madagascar, Seychelles, Mayotte
 I. littoralis Abraham, 1924 — Singapore
 I. marovo Churchill & Raven, 1992 — Solomon Is.
 I. talofa Churchill & Raven, 1992 — Samoa
 I. xmas Raven, 1988 — Australia (Christmas Is.)
 I. yerlata Churchill & Raven, 1992 — Australia (Queensland)

Idiommata

Idiommata Ausserer, 1871
 I. blackwalli (O. Pickard-Cambridge, 1870) (type) — Australia (Western Australia)
 I. fusca L. Koch, 1874 — Australia (Queensland)
 I. iridescens (Rainbow & Pulleine, 1918) — Australia (Queensland)
 I. scintillans (Rainbow & Pulleine, 1918) — Australia (South Australia)

Idiophthalma

Idiophthalma O. Pickard-Cambridge, 1877
 I. amazonica Simon, 1889 — Brazil
 I. ecuadorensis Berland, 1913 — Ecuador
 I. pantherina Simon, 1889 — Venezuela
 I. robusta Simon, 1889 — Ecuador
 I. suspecta O. Pickard-Cambridge, 1877 (type) — Colombia

M

Mandjelia

Mandjelia Raven, 1994
 M. anzses Raven & Churchill, 1994 — Australia (Queensland)
 M. banksi Raven & Churchill, 1994 — Australia (Queensland)
 M. brassi Raven & Churchill, 1994 (type) — Australia (Queensland)
 M. colemani Raven & Churchill, 1994 — Australia (Queensland)
 M. commoni Raven & Churchill, 1994 — Australia (Queensland)
 M. exasperans Raven & Churchill, 1994 — Australia (Queensland)
 M. fleckeri Raven & Churchill, 1994 — Australia (Queensland)
 M. galmarra Raven & Churchill, 1994 — Australia (Queensland)
 M. humphreysi Raven & Churchill, 1994 — Australia (Western Australia)
 M. iwupataka Raven & Churchill, 1994 — Australia (Northern Territory)
 M. macgregori Raven & Churchill, 1994 — Australia (Queensland)
 M. madura Raven & Churchill, 1994 — Australia (Western Australia)
 M. mccrackeni Raven & Churchill, 1994 — Australia (Queensland)
 M. nuganuga Raven & Churchill, 1994 — Australia (Queensland)
 M. oenpelli Raven & Churchill, 1994 — Australia (Northern Territory)
 M. paluma Raven & Churchill, 1994 — Australia (Queensland)
 M. platnicki Raven, 1994 — New Caledonia
 M. qantas Raven & Churchill, 1994 — Australia (Queensland)
 M. rejae Raven & Churchill, 1994 — Australia (Queensland)
 M. thorelli (Raven, 1990) — Australia (Queensland)
 M. wooroonooran Raven & Churchill, 1994 — Australia (Queensland)
 M. wyandotte Raven & Churchill, 1994 — Australia (Queensland)
 M. yuccabine Raven & Churchill, 1994 — Australia (Queensland)

Monodontium

Monodontium Kulczyński, 1908
 M. bukittimah Raven, 2008 — Singapore
 M. malkini Raven, 2008 — New Guinea
 M. mutabile Kulczyński, 1908 (type) — New Guinea
 M. sarawak Raven, 2008 — Borneo
 M. tetrathela Kulczyński, 1908 — New Guinea

Moruga

Moruga Raven, 1994
 M. doddi Raven, 1994 — Australia (Queensland)
 M. fuliginea (Thorell, 1881) — Australia (Queensland)
 M. heatherae Raven, 1994 — Australia (Queensland)
 M. insularis Raven, 1994 — Australia (Queensland)
 M. kimberleyi Raven, 1994 — Australia (Western Australia)
 M. thickthorni Raven, 1994 (type) — Australia (Queensland)
 M. thorsborneorum Raven, 1994 — Australia (Queensland)
 M. wallaceae Raven, 1994 — Australia (Queensland)

N

Natgeogia

Natgeogia Raven, 1994
 N. rastellata Raven, 1994 (type) — New Caledonia

Neodiplothele

Neodiplothele Mello-Leitão, 1917
 N. aureus Gonzalez-Filho, Lucas & Brescovit, 2015 — Brazil
 N. caucaia Gonzalez-Filho, Lucas & Brescovit, 2015 — Brazil
 N. flavicoma (Simon, 1891) — Brazil
 N. fluminensis Mello-Leitão, 1924 — Brazil
 N. indicattii Gonzalez-Filho, Lucas & Brescovit, 2015 — Brazil
 N. irregularis Mello-Leitão, 1917 (type) — Brazil
 N. itabaiana Gonzalez-Filho, Lucas & Brescovit, 2015 — Brazil
 N. martinsi Gonzalez-Filho, Lucas & Brescovit, 2015 — Brazil
 N. picta Vellard, 1924 — Brazil

Nihoa

Nihoa Raven & Churchill, 1992
 N. annulata (Kulczyński, 1908) — New Guinea
 N. annulipes (Thorell, 1881) — New Guinea
 N. aussereri (L. Koch, 1874) — Palau Is.
 N. bisianumu Raven, 1994 — New Guinea
 N. courti Raven, 1994 — New Guinea
 N. crassipes (Rainbow, 1898) — New Guinea
 N. gressitti Raven, 1994 — New Guinea
 N. gruberi Raven, 1994 — Papua New Guinea (New Ireland)
 N. hawaiiensis (Raven, 1988) — Hawaii
 N. itakara Raven, 1994 — New Guinea
 N. kaindi Raven, 1994 — New Guinea
 N. karawari Raven, 1994 — New Guinea
 N. lambleyi Raven, 1994 — New Guinea
 N. madang Raven, 1994 — New Guinea
 N. mahina Churchill & Raven, 1992 (type) — Hawaii
 N. maior (Kulczyński, 1908) — New Guinea
 N. mambulu Raven, 1994 — Solomon Is.
 N. pictipes (Pocock, 1898) — New Guinea, Papua New Guinea (New Britain, New Ireland), Solomon Is.
 N. raleighi Raven, 1994 — New Guinea
 N. tatei Raven, 1994 — New Guinea
 N. vanuatu Raven, 1994 — Vanuatu
 N. variata (Thorell, 1881) — New Guinea
 N. verireti Raven, 1994 — New Guinea

O

Orstom

Orstom Raven, 1994
 O. aoupinie Raven, 1994 — New Caledonia
 O. chazeaui Raven & Churchill, 1994 (type) — New Caledonia
 O. hydratemei Raven & Churchill, 1994 — New Caledonia
 O. macmillani Raven, 1994 — New Caledonia
 O. tropicus Raven, 1994 — New Caledonia
 O. undecimatus Raven, 1994 — New Caledonia

Ozicrypta

Ozicrypta Raven, 1994
 O. australoborealis Raven & Churchill, 1994 — Australia (Northern Territory)
 O. clarki Raven & Churchill, 1994 — Australia (Queensland)
 O. clyneae Raven & Churchill, 1994 — Australia (Queensland)
 O. combeni Raven & Churchill, 1994 — Australia (Queensland)
 O. cooloola Raven & Churchill, 1994 (type) — Australia (Queensland)
 O. digglesi Raven & Churchill, 1994 — Australia (Queensland)
 O. etna Raven & Churchill, 1994 — Australia (Queensland)
 O. eungella Raven & Churchill, 1994 — Australia (Queensland)
 O. filmeri Raven & Churchill, 1994 — Australia (Queensland)
 O. hollinsae Raven & Churchill, 1994 — Australia (Queensland)
 O. kroombit Raven & Churchill, 1994 — Australia (Queensland)
 O. lawlessi Raven & Churchill, 1994 — Australia (Queensland)
 O. littleorum Raven & Churchill, 1994 — Australia (Queensland)
 O. mcarthurae Raven & Churchill, 1994 — Australia (Queensland)
 O. mcdonaldi Raven & Churchill, 1994 — Australia (Queensland)
 O. microcauda Raven & Churchill, 1994 — Australia (Queensland)
 O. noonamah Raven & Churchill, 1994 — Australia (Northern Territory)
 O. palmarum (Hogg, 1901) — Australia (Northern Territory)
 O. pearni Raven & Churchill, 1994 — Australia (Queensland)
 O. reticulata (L. Koch, 1874) — Australia (Queensland)
 O. sinclairi Raven & Churchill, 1994 — Australia (Queensland)
 O. tuckeri Raven & Churchill, 1994 — Australia (Queensland)
 O. walkeri Raven & Churchill, 1994 — Australia (Queensland)
 O. wallacei Raven & Churchill, 1994 — Australia (Queensland)
 O. wrightae Raven & Churchill, 1994 — Australia (Queensland)

P

Paracenobiopelma

Paracenobiopelma Feio, 1952
 P. gerecormophilum Feio, 1952 (type) — Brazil

Pisenor

Pisenor Simon, 1889
 P. arcturus (Tucker, 1917) — Zimbabwe
 P. leleupi (Benoit, 1965) — Congo
 P. lepidus (Gerstaecker, 1873) — Tanzania
 P. macequece (Tucker, 1920) — Mozambique
 P. notius Simon, 1889 (type) — Ethiopia to Zimbabwe
 P. plicatus (Benoit, 1965) — Rwanda
 P. selindanus (Benoit, 1965) — Zimbabwe
 P. tenuistylus (Benoit, 1965) — Congo
 P. upembanus (Roewer, 1953) — Congo

Plagiobothrus

Plagiobothrus Karsch, 1892
 P. semilunaris Karsch, 1892 (type) — Sri Lanka

† Psalistops

† Psalistops Simon, 1889
 † P. hispaniolensis Wunderlich, 1988

Q

Questocrypta

Questocrypta Raven, 1994
 Q. goloboffi Raven, 1994 (type) — New Caledonia

R

Rhianodes

Rhianodes Raven, 1985
 R. atratus (Thorell, 1890) (type) — Malaysia, Singapore, Philippines

S

Sason

Sason Simon, 1887
 S. andamanicum (Simon, 1888) — India (Andaman Is.)
 S. colemani Raven, 1986 — Australia (Queensland)
 S. hirsutum Schwendinger, 2003 — Indonesia
 S. maculatum (Roewer, 1963) — Mariana Is., Caroline Is.
 S. pectinatum Kulczyński, 1908 — New Guinea
 S. rameshwaram Siliwal & Molur, 2009 — India
 S. robustum (O. Pickard-Cambridge, 1883) (type) — India, Sri Lanka, Seychelles
 S. sechellanum Simon, 1898 — Seychelles
 S. sundaicum Schwendinger, 2003 — Thailand, Malaysia

Sasonichus

Sasonichus Pocock, 1900
 S. sullivani Pocock, 1900 (type) — India

Seqocrypta

Seqocrypta Raven, 1994
 S. bancrofti Raven, 1994 — Australia (New South Wales)
 S. hamlynharrisi Raven & Churchill, 1994 — Australia (Queensland)
 S. jakara Raven, 1994 (type) — Australia (Queensland, New South Wales)
 S. mckeowni Raven, 1994 — Australia (New South Wales)

Sipalolasma

Sipalolasma Simon, 1892
 S. aedificatrix Abraham, 1924 — Malaysia
 S. arthrapophysis (Gravely, 1915) — India
 S. bicalcarata (Simon, 1904) — Ethiopia
 S. ellioti Simon, 1892 (type) — Sri Lanka
 S. greeni Pocock, 1900 — Sri Lanka
 S. humicola (Benoit, 1965) — Mozambique
 S. kissi Benoit, 1966 — Congo
 S. ophiriensis Abraham, 1924 — Malaysia
 S. warnantae Benoit, 1966 — Congo

Strophaeus

Strophaeus Ausserer, 1875
 S. austeni (F. O. Pickard-Cambridge, 1896) — Brazil
 S. kochi (O. Pickard-Cambridge, 1870) (type) — Peru
 S. pentodon (Simon, 1892) — Brazil
 S. sebastiani Miranda & Bermúdez, 2010 — Panama

Synothele

Synothele Simon, 1908
 S. arrakis Raven, 1994 — Australia (Western Australia)
 S. boongaree Raven, 1994 — Australia (Western Australia)
 S. butleri Raven, 1994 — Australia (Western Australia)
 S. durokoppin Raven, 1994 — Australia (Western Australia)
 S. goongarrie Raven, 1994 — Australia (Western Australia)
 S. harveyi Churchill & Raven, 1994 — Australia (Western Australia)
 S. houstoni Raven, 1994 — Australia (Western Australia)
 S. howi Raven, 1994 — Australia (Western Australia)
 S. karara Raven, 1994 — Australia (Western Australia)
 S. koonalda Raven, 1994 — Australia (South Australia)
 S. longbottomi Raven, 1994 — Australia (Western Australia)
 S. lowei Raven, 1994 — Australia (Western Australia)
 S. meadhunteri Raven, 1994 — Australia (Western Australia, South Australia)
 S. michaelseni Simon, 1908 (type) — Australia (Western Australia)
 S. moonabie Raven, 1994 — Australia (South Australia)
 S. mullaloo Raven, 1994 — Australia (Western Australia)
 S. ooldea Raven, 1994 — Australia (South Australia)
 S. parifusca (Main, 1954) — Australia (Western Australia)
 S. pectinata Raven, 1994 — Australia (Western Australia)
 S. rastelloides Raven, 1994 — Australia (Western Australia)
 S. rubripes Raven, 1994 — Australia (Western Australia)
 S. subquadrata Raven, 1994 — Australia (Western Australia)
 S. taurus Raven, 1994 — Australia (Western Australia)
 S. yundamindra Raven, 1994 — Australia (Western Australia)

T

Thalerommata

Thalerommata Ausserer, 1875
 T. gracilis Ausserer, 1875 (type) — Colombia
 T. macella (Simon, 1903) — Colombia
 T. meridana (Chamberlin & Ivie, 1938) — Mexico

Tigidia

Tigidia Simon, 1892
 T. alluaudi (Simon, 1902) — Madagascar
 T. bastardi (Simon, 1902) — Madagascar
 T. dubia (Strand, 1907) — Madagascar
 T. konkanensis Mirza, Zende & Patil, 2016 — India
 T. majori (Pocock, 1903) — Madagascar
 T. mathiauxi (Simon, 1902) — Madagascar
 T. mauriciana Simon, 1892 (type) — Mauritius
 T. nilgiriensis Sanap, Mirza & Siliwal, 2011 — India
 T. rutilofronis Sanap, Mirza & Siliwal, 2011 — India
 T. sahyadri Siliwal, Gupta & Raven, 2011 — India
 T. typica (Strand, 1907) — Madagascar

Trittame

Trittame L. Koch, 1874
 T. augusteyni Raven, 1994 — Australia (Queensland)
 T. bancrofti (Rainbow & Pulleine, 1918) — Australia (Queensland)
 T. berniesmythi Raven, 1994 — Australia (Queensland)
 T. forsteri Raven, 1990 — Australia (Queensland)
 T. gracilis L. Koch, 1874 (type) — Australia (Queensland)
 T. ingrami Raven, 1990 — Australia (Queensland)
 T. kochi Raven, 1990 — Australia (Queensland)
 T. loki Raven, 1990 — Australia (Queensland)
 T. mccolli Raven, 1994 — Australia (Queensland)
 T. rainbowi Raven, 1994 — Australia (Queensland)
 T. stonieri Raven, 1994 — Australia (Queensland)
 T. xerophila Raven, 1990 — Australia (Queensland)

Troglothele

Troglothele Fage, 1929
 T. coeca Fage, 1929 (type) — Cuba

Tungari

Tungari Raven, 1994
 T. aurukun Raven, 1994 — Australia (Queensland)
 T. kenwayae Raven, 1994 (type) — Australia (Queensland)
 T. mascordi Raven, 1994 — Australia (Queensland)
 T. monteithi Raven, 1994 — Australia (Queensland)

Z

Zophorame

Zophorame Raven, 1990
 Z. covacevichae Raven, 1994 — Australia (Queensland)
 Z. gallonae Raven, 1990 — Australia (Queensland)
 Z. hirsti Raven, 1994 — Australia (Queensland)
 Z. simoni Raven, 1990 (type) — Australia (Queensland)

Zophoryctes

Zophoryctes Simon, 1902
 Z. flavopilosus Simon, 1902 (type) — Madagascar

References

Barychelidae